Brink, stylized as brink. is an American news documentary television series that was produced by CBS Eye Too Productions for the Science Channel and that originally aired from November 28, 2008, to August 25, 2009. The program is hosted by Australian Josh Szeps and presents stories about up and coming science and technology in a magazine style.

See also
Tomorrow's World
The Next Step
Beyond Tomorrow
Daily Planet

External links
Official website

Science Channel original programming
2000s American documentary television series
2000s American reality television series
2008 American television series debuts
2009 American television series endings
Television series by CBS Studios
CBS News